John McBeath Potter (November 11, 1911 – 1985) was a Canadian politician. He served in the Legislative Assembly of New Brunswick from 1974 to 1978 as member of the Progressive Conservative party from the riding of Dalhousie.

References

1911 births
1985 deaths
People from Moncton
Progressive Conservative Party of New Brunswick MLAs